The Chhattisgarh Legislative Assembly is the unicameral state legislature of Chhattisgarh state in India.

The seat of the Legislative Assembly is at Raipur, the capital of the state. The term of the Legislative Assembly is five years, unless dissolved earlier. Presently, it comprises 90 members who are directly elected from single-seat constituencies.

List 
Following are the list of Constituencies in the Legislative Assembly of Chhattisgarh

References

 
Chhattisgarh
Constituencies